The Ralph Stanley Museum is a monument to Ralph Edmond Stanley, an American bluegrass musician known for his distinctive singing and banjo playing.

History and description
The museum opened in October 2004, in Clintwood, Virginia (close to McClure, Virginia, where Stanley was born). It is also accompanied by a Traditional Mountain Music Center, where  private parties and meetings can be held.

The museum is one of the venues of Crooked Road, Virginia, on Virginia's Heritage Music Trail, which is designed to generate tourism and economic development in the Appalachian region of Southwestern Virginia by focusing on the region's unique musical heritage. The vision for the museum and music center is to preserve and promote mountain and Bluegrass music with workshops, seminars, and conventions.

The museum is decorated to look more subjective, including the front desk which looks like an oversized banjo. The museum describes many of Stanley's travels and contains some of his older possessions, including instruments and journals.

Every May, the museum hosts Ralph Stanley Days, a festival devoted to Stanley's culture and work.

See also
 List of music museums

References

External links
 

Museums in Dickenson County, Virginia
Music museums in Virginia
Stanley, Ralph
Museums established in 2004
2004 establishments in Virginia